Piapot 75 is an Indian reserve of the Piapot Cree Nation in Saskatchewan. It is 43 kilometres west of Fort Qu'Appelle. In the 2016 Canadian Census, it recorded a population of 516 living in 143 of its 171 total private dwellings. In the same year, its Community Well-Being index was calculated at 55 of 100, compared to 58.4 for the average First Nations community and 77.5 for the average non-Indigenous community.

References

Cree reserves and territories
Indian reserves in Saskatchewan
Division No. 6, Saskatchewan
Piapot Cree Nation